State Road 326 (SR 326) is an east–west route in Marion County, Florida, in and around Ocala. The western terminus is near Interstate 75's (I-75) exit 358, and its eastern end is at SR 40 east of Silver Springs. The highway acts as a bypass around Ocala, taking traffic to SR 40 on the edge of the Ocala National Forest.

West of I-75, the road continues as County Road 326 (CR 326) in Marion and Levy counties to the Waccasassa River near Gulf Hammock with another segment leading to the Lower Suwannee National Wildlife Refuge adjacent to the Gulf of Mexico.

Major intersections

References

External links

Florida Route Log (SR 326)

326
326
326
326